Lucas Macías Navarro (born in Valverde del Camino, Huelva, August 11, 1978) is a Spanish oboist. He is a former member of the Royal Concertgebouw Orchestra, where he served as principal oboe together with Alexei Ogrintchouk. He also plays with the Lucerne Festival Orchestra and the Orchestra Mozart. In 2018, he has been appointed Chief Conductor of the Oviedo Filarmonía.

References

  Royal Concertgebouw Orchestra

External links 
 Official Website of Lucas Macías Navarro
 Profile of Lucas Macías Navarro at the Hochschule für Musik Freiburg

1978 births
Living people
Players of the Royal Concertgebouw Orchestra
Spanish oboists
Male oboists
Spanish male musicians